Mauritius competed at the 2017 World Games in Wroclaw, Poland, from 20 July 2017 to 30 July 2017.

Competitors

Kickboxing

Mauritius has qualified at the 2017 World Games

Men's -81 kg -

References

Nations at the 2017 World Games
Wor
2017